The women's marathon event at the 1991 Pan American Games was held in Havana, Cuba on 3 August.

Results

References

Athletics at the 1991 Pan American Games
1991
Pan
Panamerican
Marathons in Cuba
1991 Panamerican Games